The Frierson-Coble House is a historic house in Shelbyville, Tennessee, U.S.. It was built in 1835 for Erwin J. Frierson, who was trained as a lawyer by James K. Polk, who went on to serve as the 11th President of the United States from 1845 to 1849. Frierson served as a member of the Tennessee House of Representatives in 1845. In 1888, the house was purchased by Dr Neely Coble, a physician; it was later inherited by his son, Thomas Coble, also a physician. By the 1980s, it still belonged to the Coble family. It has been listed on the National Register of Historic Places since April 12, 1982.

References

Houses on the National Register of Historic Places in Tennessee
Federal architecture in Tennessee
Greek Revival houses in Tennessee
Gothic Revival architecture in Tennessee
Houses completed in 1835
National Register of Historic Places in Bedford County, Tennessee
Buildings and structures in Shelbyville, Tennessee